Mimenicodes is a genus of longhorn beetles of the subfamily Lamiinae, containing the following species:

subgenus Granulenicodes
 Mimenicodes granulum (Fauvel, 1906)
 Mimenicodes perroudi (Montrouzier, 1861)

subgenus Mimenicodes
 Mimenicodes aureovitta Breuning, 1953
 Mimenicodes bougieri (Fauvel, 1906)
 Mimenicodes cohici Lepesme & Breuning, 1953
 Mimenicodes cylindricus (Fauvel, 1906)
 Mimenicodes cylindroides Breuning, 1940
 Mimenicodes flavolineatus Breuning, 1978
 Mimenicodes fractimacula (Fauvel, 1906)
 Mimenicodes latreillei (Fauvel, 1906)
 Mimenicodes obliquatus Breuning, 1942
 Mimenicodes opacoides Breuning, 1982
 Mimenicodes opacus (Fauvel, 1906)
 Mimenicodes rugiceps (Fauvel, 1906)
 Mimenicodes scripticollis (Fauvel, 1906)
 Mimenicodes subunicolor Breuning, 1973
 Mimenicodes thomsoni (Fauvel, 1906)
 Mimenicodes unicolor Breuning, 1940

References

Enicodini